Prince Benedetto, Duke of Chablais (Benedetto Maria Maurizio; 21 June 1741 – 4 January 1808) was an Italian nobleman and military leader. He was the youngest child of King Charles Emmanuel III of Sardinia. He married his niece Maria Anna of Savoy; they had no children. Benedetto was the owner of the Palazzo Chiablese in Turin.

Biography

Chablais was born at the Palace of Venaria. He was the youngest child of Charles Emmanuel III of Sardinia and  Élisabeth Thérèse of Lorraine. His mother died giving birth to him. He was named after Pope Benedict XIV who became pope the year before his birth.

Known alternatively as Benedetto or Maurizio, at the time of his birth, he was third in line to the Sardinian throne after his oldest half brother Victor Amadeus, Duke of Savoy and Prince Carlo his only full brother who died in infancy. His paternal cousins included Louis XV of France, the future Ferdinand VI of Spain and the Prince of Carignan. His maternal cousins included the future Queen of Naples and the famous Marie Antoinette.

His uncle Francis I, Holy Roman Emperor proposed his daughter Archduchess Maria Christina of Austria as a prospective wife but the marriage between the two never materialised. The Emperor wanted the marriage to encourage ties between the House of Lorraine and the House of Savoy.

In 1753 his father gave what is now the Palazzo Chiablese as his personal residence. It was under Savoy that the building would be embellished under the direction of Benedetto Alfieri, a popular Savoyard architect of the era.

In 1763 his father granted him the Duchy of Chablais (the prince having been styled Duke of Chablais since birth), with the subsidiary lands of Cureggio, Trino, Dezan, Crescentino, Riva di Chieri, Well, Ghemme Pollenzo Tricerro, and Apertole Centallo. His brother, later Victor Amadeus III of Sardinia, created him Marquis of Ivrea on 19 June 1796. In 1764 Chablais also bought the fiefdom of Agliè, where the Ducal Palace of Agliè was situated, from his brother. Chablais also carried out improvements to the building under the direction of Ignatius Birago Borgaro.

Chablais married Maria Anna of Savoy at the Royal Palace of Turin on 19 March 1775. Maria Anna was his niece, and sixth child of his oldest brother Victor Amadeus III of Sardinia, and his consort Maria Antonietta of Spain. The marriage produced no children, Maria Anna dying in 1824.

Noted as a good soldier  Chablais was given control of the Army of Italy which contained French troops and intended on restoring the monarchy in France after the execution of Louis XVI in 1793. He took part in the Battle of Loano.

He died in Rome aged 66 and was buried at the church of San Nicolo dei Cesarini then later moved to the Royal Basilica of Superga, Turin. At his death the title of Duke of Chablais reverted to the crown.

Ancestry

Notes

References

External links

See also

1741 births
1808 deaths
Nobility from Turin
Military personnel from Turin
Princes of Savoy
Burials at the Basilica of Superga
Military leaders of the French Revolutionary Wars
Italian people of the French Revolutionary Wars
Italian people of French descent
Dukes of Chablais
Sons of kings